759: Boy Scouts of Harlem is a family documentary about Boy Scout Troop 759, which meets in Harlem. It was directed by Jake Boritt and Justin Szlasa who also produced, wrote, and edited the film.

The film premiered as a free community event on March 14, 2009 at the Schomburg Center for Research in Black Culture in Harlem on Malcolm X Boulevard.  Two weeks later it screened on board the Intrepid Sea-Air-Space Museum in Manhattan, then on October 8, 2009 Senator Jeff Sessions and Senator Ben Nelson sponsored a screening on Capitol Hill.   The film aired on public television stations around the country starting in August 2010, as presented by Maryland Public Television.

Premise
The film follows four Boy Scouts and two Scout leaders, from the streets of Harlem to the woods of Camp Keowa on Crystal Lake in the Catskills.  The newest Scout, eleven-year-old  Keith Dozier, spends his first week at camp facing the challenges of the woods: the dock test in the deep lake, creatures of the night, the climbing tower, the raucous dining hall, and the kitchen.  With help from his fellow Scouts and Scoutmaster Sowah, young Keith faces the challenges and earns his place as a Scout.

Subjects
The Scoutmaster of Troop 759 is Okpoti Sowah, who was born in what is now Ghana.  Sowah came to the United States to pursue his education and eventually earned a master's degree from Columbia University. The assistant Scoutmaster is Ann Dozier and the featured Scouts are Keith Dozier, Devon Howard, Emmanuel Nortey and the late Colin 'K.C.' Byers (1993-2011). Camp Keowa Staff include Andy Cabrera, John X. Restrepo and Marina Chernykh.

References

Further reading 

Boston Globe Review
New York Daily News Review
Amsterdam News Review
Interview with Scouting News
Interview with Scouting Radio
Review by BSA-GNYC
Review from Condo Life

External links 

Films about the Boy Scouts of America
American documentary films
Documentary films about New York City
Harlem
2009 films
2009 documentary films
Documentary films about children
2000s English-language films
2000s American films
English-language documentary films